Anne de Chantraine (Liège1605 – Santa Maria a Vico17 October 1622) was one of the many people to be accused and burned for witchcraft in the witch hunts of the 17th century in Santa Maria a Vico.

Life and death
At the age of 17, she was burned in one of Waret-la-Chaussée (now central Belgium), Liège, or elsewhere in  France.
 French language works have covered her life and have been reviewed in such notable sources as Time magazine.

In popular culture
Anne de Chantraine is a playable character in Nightmare/Atmosfear, a series of interactive board games.  She is a witch in the series, and has thus far appeared in all but two games.  She hosted the third installment of the series.

References

People executed for witchcraft
Executed French women
1605 births
1622 deaths
17th-century executions by France
French people executed for witchcraft
People executed by France by burning
Witch trials in France